Nguyễn Thanh Diệp (born 6 September 1991) is a Vietnamese footballer who plays as a goalkeeper for V-League (Vietnam) club Thanh Hóa

Honours

Club
Đông Á Thanh Hóa
Vietnamese National Cup:
 Third place : 2022

References

1991 births
Living people
Vietnamese footballers
Vietnam international footballers
V.League 1 players
Can Tho FC players
Dong Nai FC players
People from Đồng Nai Province
Association football goalkeepers